is a vessel of the Sea Shepherd Conservation Society fleet, the ship was previously named after American television producer and writer Sam Simon, who donated the money to purchase the vessel. The ship's identity was kept secret, to be revealed when she met the Japanese whaling fleet in 2012, but was identified when her registration was discovered on the Australian Maritime Safety Authority's list of registered ships.

Age of Union is the former Japanese weather survey ship Kaiko Maru No 8. Sea Shepherd paid the Government of Japan AUD $2,000,000 for the vessel. She was renamed MV New Atlantis shortly before being moved to Brisbane, Queensland. She was subsequently re-registered under the Australian flag as a pleasure craft called Sam Simon.

Service

Age of Union was built by Ishikawajima-Harima Heavy Industries Co Ltd in Tokyo, Japan as Seifu Maru (清風丸, Seifū Maru – meaning cool breeze), a marine meteorological and oceanographic observation ship. The purpose of Seifu Maru and her sister ships was to conduct observations of the pollution affecting the marine environment in the waters around Japan and the western North Pacific, covering greenhouse gases, ozone-depleting substances, heavy metals, and oils. The Japan Meteorological Agency operated five ships: Chofu Maru (長風丸, 1987), Kofu Maru (高風丸, 1988), Seifu Maru (清風丸, 1993), Ryofu Maru (凌風丸, 1995) and Keifu Maru (啓風丸, 2000). Seifu Maru was operated by the Maizuru Marine Observatory and worked in the Sea of Japan. The Japanese ARGO Program (アルゴ計画) was completed and the un-needed vessel was sold to Offshore Operation Co. Ltd and was renamed Kaiko Maru No 8 in 2010.

In September 2012, Kaiko Maru was purchased by New Atlantis Ventures LLC, based in Wilmington, Delaware USA (a shell corporation of Sea Shepherd), and renamed New Atlantis, registered under the flag of Tuvalu. In December 2012, New Atlantis was renamed Sam Simon. $500,000 of upgrades for increased speed and range were undertaken in Brisbane, where she was docked and supplies were taken on board for the voyage to the whale sanctuary. The vessel was publicly unveiled in Hobart, Tasmania in December 2012.

On February 20, 2013, the Japanese whaling ship Nisshin Maru collided with Sam Simon,  and  multiple times in a confrontation in the Southern Ocean, north of Australia's Casey Research Station in Antarctica.

The MY Sam Simon currently operates in Europe and West Africa. In Europe, the Sam Simon crew are filming the activities of trawler type vessels in an attempt to draw attention to dolphin bycatch (dolphins unintentionally caught in the nets of the trawlers). In West Africa, the Sam Simon crew are partnering with several Governments to stop illegal fishing happening within West African waters.

As from 24 May 2021, the MY Sam Simon has been sighted in the Port of Gibraltar for a technical call.

Sam Simon was renamed Age of Union in January 2022 after a $4.5 million donation by Dax Dasilva.

References

External links

 Sea state of the Sea of Japan – Maizuru Marine Observatory (Japanese)
 Sea Meteorological Observation Report – Maizuru Marine Observatory (Japanese)
 Images of the Sam Simon

Ships built by IHI Corporation
Sea Shepherd Conservation Society ships
1993 ships
Maritime incidents in 2013
IHI Corporation